Morsasco is a comune (municipality) in the Province of Alessandria in the Italian region Piedmont, located about  southeast of Turin and about  south of Alessandria.

Morsasco borders the following municipalities: Cremolino, Orsara Bormida, Prasco, Strevi, Trisobbio, and Visone.

References

External links 
 Official website
 Morsasco Pro Loco

Cities and towns in Piedmont